Biraj Bhatta is a Nepali actor who is known for his work in Nepali cinema and Bhojpuri cinema. He has worked in some Nepali and Tharu language films as well. He has starred in more than 200 movies through different languages like Nepali , Bhojpuri & Tharu. He received National Film award for Best actor for Nepali movie Khal Nayak(2008).

Acting career

2002–2007 Debut and early work

Biraj Bhatta's first film credit was a supporting role in Khukuri  which did well at the box office. He also appeared in supporting roles in films like Unko Samjhana ma(2001) and Pauju(2002). He also made a cameo appearance in the action comedy film Raju Raja Ram(2005). He starred in the Tharu language film Abhagan Suhaagan(2005) and co-starred in Nepali films like Agnipath (2004), Durga (2005), Maidan(2005), Jeevan Daata (2005), Hami taxi driver (2006) and Dadagiri(2007). after the successful of his early movies he was appreciated by critics for his dance & Action.

2008–2011 Stardom, success, and break from Nepali film industry )

He starred in the lead role in Himmat, Kismat, Khayal Nayak, Sisila, Agni Jwala, Ilaka, Itihaas, Taqdeer, Arjun Dev, Dosti, Naina Resham, Giraftar, Himmat 2, Dhoom, Sapoot, Naya Nepal, Darr and many more. In a short time he appeared in more than 76 successful movies from 2000 to 2011. He became a star in Bhojpuri cinema after his successful debut in movie Lagal Raha yeh Raja ji(2008).His last release of a Nepali movie was Migra Trishana (2011) which starred Nandita K.C. and was directed by Tulsi Ghimire. Following the release of Migra Trishana his only Bhojpuri-dubbed movies released with five-year gaps were Karja ragat ko,  Kundali, Gunda, Kartoos, Mard, jungbhoomi,  Shooter, Pratikar & Damini—all were commercial failures.

2012–2015 Stardom In Bhojpuri

He starred in his first Bhojpuri Movie Lagal raha ye Raja ji (2007). He starred in Bhojpuri movies such as Mard Tangewala (2009), Hum Hai Hero Hindustani (2009), Mard Rikshawala (2010), Jaanwar (2012), Panchayat, Mahabharat, Durga, Rang, Gunday, Trishul, Shooter, Damini, Son of Bihar, Jungle Raaz, Hitler, Janeman, Lohe Ki Zanjeer, Daag, Bhaagi, Kartoos and others. He is called a " He Man" of  Bhojpuri cinema. He appeared in more than 80 Bhojpuri movies in 5 years.

2016 Comeback to Nepali film, and slump)

In 2016 he was in the action film Jai Parshuram.  Although the film was a commercial failure, his performance in this movie was highly appreciated especially in its action part. He committed to star in the film Harke Raja but it was not made.

2019–present Sangalo success and upcoming project 

In 2019, the Action King returned, starring in Sangalo, in which he directed and acted  opposite Nikita Chandak. The film was huge BlockBuster at the box office by grossing more than 8 Crore against the  budget of 2 Crore . He also is committed to star in Dhoom 4 after huge success of Sangalo. Biraj Bhatta also announced that he will again produce and direct Sangalo Sequel.

Stage performance 

Biraj Bhatta has performed on Bhojpuri and Nepali shows in Qatar.

Filmography

See also
 List of Nepalese actors

References

External links 
 
 

21st-century Nepalese male actors
Living people
Nepalese male film actors
People from Kailali District
Year of birth missing (living people)